Haruno (written: 春野 or 榛野) is a Japanese surname. Notable people with the surname include:

, Japanese voice actress 
, Japanese manga artist
, Japanese actress

Fictional characters:
, a main character in the manga series Naruto
, the main protagonist of Go! Princess Pretty Cure

Haruno (written: 春乃 or 葉瑠乃) is also a feminine Japanese given name. Notable people with the name include:

, Japanese women's basketball player
, Japanese general
, Japanese handball player

Fictional characters:
Giorno Giovanna, the protagonist in the fifth JoJo's Bizarre Adventure story arc Golden Wind, whose name was originally Haruno Shiobana (汐華 初流乃) before changing his name when he moved to Italy.

See also
Haruno, Kōchi, a former town in Agawa District, Kōchi Prefecture, Japan
Haruno Stadium, a football stadium in Haruno, Kōchi, Japan
Haruno, Shizuoka, a former town in Shūchi District, Shizuoka Prefecture, Japan

Japanese feminine given names
Japanese-language surnames